Ryan Doyle (born 22 September 1984) is a freerunner, martial artist, coach, and actor from Liverpool, England, and is a founding athlete of the World Freerunning and Parkour Federation.

Freerunning and parkour interests
In his teenage years, Doyle trained in the Korean martial art of Kuk Sool Won, and developed his running style by adding his own freerunning movements to the martial arts techniques he had learned.  Doyle began his freerunner career by winning the 2007 Art of Motion competition in Vienna.  He broke his leg in the competition while attempting a trick from a 12-foot jump during the finals.  This left Doyle with a plate on his fibula and a 33 cm bar with 14 screws down the core of his shin bone.  Despite this setback, Doyle made a full recovery.

Even though he suffers from poor eyesight, Doyle is a two-time winner of the Red Bull Art of Motion competition.  He is now officially sponsored by Red Bull energy drink.

In 2011 Doyle won the Art of Motion competition again.  He received eighth place in the Red Bull Art of Motion 2012 (staged in Santorini, Greece), following a tour applying urban acrobatic techniques at the sites of the seven wonders of the world.

Media attention
Doyle was a cast member of MTV's Ultimate Parkour Challenge in 2010, and played the role of Finch in the 2011 movie Freerunner.

His "Doyle's Travel Story" won the award for "Best International Series" at the YouTube Streamy Awards (2013)

Competition statistics

Red Bull Art of Motion

References

External links

1984 births
Living people
British people of Irish descent
Freerunners
Martial artists from Liverpool
Place of birth missing (living people)
Sportspeople from Liverpool
Streamy Award winners